Daniel Rosario Rodríguez (born April 10, 2002) is a Puerto Rican footballer who currently plays for Boston University Terriers.

Career 
Rosario played in his native Puerto Rico with Gladiadores de Dorado and Eleven FC, before his family moved to Florida and he joined the Orlando City academy in 2016.

Senior
In March 2020, Rivera signed an academy contract with Orlando City B, Orlando City's USL League One affiliate. He made his debut on 28 August 2020, appearing as a 75th-minute substitute during a 1–1 draw with South Georgia Tormenta.

International
Rosario made his Puerto Rico under-17 debut in 2019 during 2019 CONCACAF U-17 Championship qualifying and later represented the team during the knockout stage, starting in a 2–1 loss to Mexico in the Round of 16.

On January 19, 2021, he made his senior debut with Puerto Rico starting in a friendly 1–0 win over Dominican Republic.

References

External links 
 
 
 Daniel Rosario | Orlando City Soccer Club Orlando City bio

2002 births
Living people
Association football defenders
Orlando City B players
People from Altamonte Springs, Florida
Puerto Rican footballers
Puerto Rico international footballers
Soccer players from Florida
Sportspeople from Bayamón, Puerto Rico
Sportspeople from Seminole County, Florida
USL League One players
Boston University Terriers men's soccer players